"Un amour pour moi" (meaning "A Love for Me") is the third single from Celine Dion's album Mélanie. It was released on 25  February 1985 in Quebec, Canada. The B-side included another album track called "Comme on disait avant". It was also featured on Dion's album Les oiseaux du bonheur, released the same year in France. On 9 March 1985, the song entered the chart in Quebec, spending nineteen weeks on it and peaking at number twelve.

Track listings and formats
Canadian 7" single
"Un amour pour moi" – 3:20
"Comme on disait avant" – 3:30

Charts

References

1984 singles
1984 songs
Celine Dion songs
French-language songs
Song recordings produced by Eddy Marnay
Songs written by Eddy Marnay